Ádám Fekete (born 22 January 1988 in Nyíregyháza, Hungary) is a footballer who plays in Hungary for Kazincbarcikai SC. He has previously played for English club Stoke City in their youth Academy before returning to play professional football with his home town club.

Club statistics

Updated to games played as of 19 May 2019.

References

1988 births
Living people
People from Nyíregyháza
Hungarian footballers
Association football forwards
Nyíregyháza Spartacus FC players
Baktalórántháza VSE footballers
Tuzsér SE footballers
Szigetszentmiklósi TK footballers
DSV Leoben players
Balmazújvárosi FC players
Kazincbarcikai SC footballers
Nemzeti Bajnokság I players
Nemzeti Bajnokság II players
Hungarian expatriate footballers
Expatriate footballers in Austria
Hungarian expatriate sportspeople in Austria
Sportspeople from Szabolcs-Szatmár-Bereg County